In mathematics, specifically functional analysis, Mercer's theorem is a representation of a symmetric positive-definite function on a square as a sum of a convergent sequence of product functions. It is an important theoretical tool in the theory of integral equations; it is used in the Hilbert space theory of stochastic processes, for example the Karhunen–Loève theorem; and it is also used to characterize a symmetric positive-definite kernel.

Introduction 
To explain Mercer's theorem, we first consider an important special case; see below for a more general formulation.
A kernel, in this context, is a symmetric continuous function

where symmetric means that  for all .

K is said to be positive-definite if and only if

for all finite sequences of points x1, ..., xn of [a, b] and all choices of real numbers c1, ..., cn.  Note that the term "positive-definite" is well-established in literature despite the weak inequality in the definition. 

Associated to K is a linear operator (more specifically a Hilbert–Schmidt integral operator) on functions defined by the integral

For technical considerations we assume  can range through the space 
L2[a, b] (see Lp space) of square-integrable real-valued functions.
Since TK is a linear operator, we can talk about eigenvalues and eigenfunctions of TK.

Theorem. Suppose K is a continuous symmetric positive-definite kernel.  Then there is an orthonormal basis
{ei}i of L2[a, b] consisting of eigenfunctions of TK such that the corresponding
sequence of eigenvalues {λi}i is nonnegative.  The eigenfunctions corresponding to non-zero eigenvalues are continuous on [a, b] and K has the representation

where the convergence is absolute and uniform.

Details 
We now explain in greater detail the structure of the proof of
Mercer's theorem, particularly how it relates to spectral theory of compact operators.

 The map K  ↦ TK is  injective.
 TK is a non-negative symmetric  compact operator on L2[a,b]; moreover K(x, x) ≥ 0.

To show compactness, show that the image of the unit ball of L2[a,b] under TK equicontinuous and apply Ascoli's theorem, to show that the image of the unit ball is relatively compact in C([a,b]) with the uniform norm and a fortiori in L2[a,b].

Now apply the spectral theorem for compact operators on Hilbert
spaces to TK to show the existence of the
orthonormal basis {ei}i of
L2[a,b]

If λi ≠ 0, the eigenvector (eigenfunction) ei is seen to be continuous on [a,b].  Now

which shows that the sequence

converges absolutely and uniformly to a kernel K0 which is easily seen to define the same operator as the kernel K.  Hence K=K0 from which Mercer's theorem follows.

Finally, to show non-negativity of the eigenvalues one can write  and expressing the right hand side as an integral well-approximated by its Riemann sums, which are non-negative
by positive-definiteness of K, implying , implying .

Trace 
The following is immediate:

Theorem.  Suppose K is a continuous symmetric positive-definite kernel; TK has a  sequence of nonnegative
eigenvalues {λi}i.  Then

This shows that the operator TK is a trace class operator and

Generalizations 
Mercer's theorem itself is a generalization of the result that any symmetric positive-semidefinite matrix is the Gramian matrix of a set of vectors.

The first generalization  replaces the interval [a, b] with any compact Hausdorff space and Lebesgue measure on [a, b] is replaced by a finite countably additive measure μ on the Borel algebra of X whose support is X.  This means that μ(U) > 0 for any nonempty open subset U of X.

A recent generalization  replaces these conditions by the following: the set X is a first-countable topological space endowed with a Borel (complete) measure μ. X is the support of μ and, for all x in X, there is an open set U containing x and having finite measure. Then essentially the same result holds:

Theorem. Suppose K is a continuous symmetric  positive-definite kernel on X. If the function κ is L1μ(X), where κ(x)=K(x,x), for all x in X, then there is an orthonormal set
{ei}i of L2μ(X) consisting of eigenfunctions of TK such that corresponding
sequence of eigenvalues {λi}i is nonnegative.  The eigenfunctions corresponding to non-zero eigenvalues are continuous on X and K has the representation

where the convergence is absolute and uniform on compact subsets of X.

The next generalization  deals with representations of measurable kernels.

Let (X, M, μ) be a σ-finite measure space.  An L2 (or square-integrable) kernel on X is a function

L2 kernels define a bounded operator TK by the formula

TK is a compact operator (actually it is even a Hilbert–Schmidt operator).  If the kernel K is symmetric, by the spectral theorem, TK  has an orthonormal basis of eigenvectors. Those eigenvectors that correspond to non-zero eigenvalues can be arranged in a sequence {ei}i (regardless of separability).

Theorem.  If K is a symmetric positive-definite kernel on (X, M, μ), then

where the convergence in the  L2 norm.  Note that when continuity of the kernel is not assumed, the expansion no longer converges uniformly.

Mercer's condition
In mathematics, a real-valued function K(x,y) is said to fulfill Mercer's condition if for all square-integrable functions g(x) one has

Discrete analog
This is analogous to the definition of a positive-semidefinite matrix. This is a matrix  of dimension , which satisfies, for all vectors , the property
.

Examples
A positive constant function

satisfies Mercer's condition, as then the integral becomes by Fubini's theorem 

which is indeed non-negative.

See also 
 Kernel trick
 Representer theorem
 Spectral theory

Notes

References 
 Adriaan Zaanen, Linear Analysis, North Holland Publishing Co., 1960,
 Ferreira, J. C., Menegatto, V. A., Eigenvalues of integral operators defined by smooth positive definite kernels, Integral equation and Operator Theory, 64 (2009), no. 1, 61–81. (Gives the generalization of Mercer's theorem for metric spaces. The result is easily adapted to first countable topological spaces)
 Konrad Jörgens, Linear integral operators, Pitman, Boston, 1982,
 Richard Courant and David Hilbert, Methods of Mathematical Physics, vol 1, Interscience 1953, 
 Robert Ash, Information Theory, Dover Publications, 1990,
 ,
 
 H. König, Eigenvalue distribution of compact operators, Birkhäuser Verlag, 1986. (Gives the generalization of Mercer's theorem for finite measures μ.)

Theorems in functional analysis